GLN may refer to:
 General linear group
 Gide Loyrette Nouel, a French law firm
 Glenview Railroad Station, in Illinois, United States
 Global Location Number
 Gln (or Q), abbreviation for the amino acid glutamine
 Guelmim Airport, in Morocco